Phan Thị Hà Thanh (born 16 October 1991) is a retired Vietnamese artistic gymnast from Haiphong and a two-time Olympian (2012 and 2016). She is currently the most decorated and successful gymnast from Vietnam on the international stage. She became the first gymnast to win a world medal for Vietnam, capturing the bronze on vault at the 2011 World Artistic Gymnastics Championships.

Gymnastics career

2009–2012 
Phan made her international debut at the 2009 World Artistic Gymnastics Championships in London. She competed in the qualifications round but did not score high enough to make any finals.

On 16 November 2010, she competed at the 2010 Asian Games in Guangzhou and finished fifth on the vault. She won silver medals on vault and balance beam at the 2010 World Cup in Porto, Portugal.

In 2011, Phan won the bronze medal on vault at the World Artistic Gymnastics Championships in Tokyo, to qualify as an individual competitor at the 2012 Summer Olympics in London. Later in 2011, she won the women's all-around competition at the Southeast Asian Games in Jakarta, Indonesia (just ahead of Vietnamese teammate Đỗ Thị Ngân Thương), as well as gold medals on vault and floor exercise and a bronze on balance beam. She went on to win the vault title at the 2011 Toyota Cup in Tokyo.

In 2012, Phan competed at the London Olympic Games. She placed 12th on vault, third reserve for the vault final.

2013–2016 
At the 6th Doha FIG World Challenge Cup in Doha, Qatar, on 28 March 2013, Phan placed first in the vault final, ahead of Romania's Larisa Iordache and Switzerland's Giulia Steingruber, with an average score of 14.825. She went on to compete at the 2013 World Artistic Gymnastics Championships in Antwerp, Belgium, and qualified to the individual vault final. In the final, she attempted a more difficult vault, the Amanar, but fell and finished seventh.

Phan began 2014 by winning a World Cup title on the balance beam in Osijek. At the 2014 Asian Games in Incheon, South Korea, she qualified to three event finals: vault, balance beam and floor exercise. She finished third on vault, behind Oksana Chusovitina of Uzbekistan and Hong Un-Jong of North Korea, the reigning world champion; second on balance beam, behind Kim Un-Hyang of North Korea; and eighth on floor exercise. Two weeks later, she competed at the 2014 World Artistic Gymnastics Championships in Nanning, China. She qualified for the vault final but finished eighth with major errors.

In the spring of 2015, she won the balance beam titles at two World Cup events (Doha and Varna, Bulgaria). Under pressure to medal in the team event at the Southeast Asian Games in Singapore, she led a minimal team of four gymnasts (full teams consisted of six gymnasts) with Đỗ Thị Vân Anh, Đỗ Thị Thu Huyen and newcomer Long Thị Ngọc Huỳnh. The team was plagued with injuries and finished fourth, but Phan qualified for all of the individual events. She went on to win the most gold medals of any gymnast at the competition (individual all-around, vault and balance beam), as well as a bronze on floor exercise. At the 2015 World Artistic Gymnastics Championships in Glasgow, she finished 85th in the all-around in qualifications with a total score of 51.033: 14.400 on vault (47th), 10.233 on uneven bars (193rd), 13.300 on balance beam (58th) and 13.100 on floor exercise (84th). Because of injuries, she opted not to attempt a second vault to qualify for the vault final.

Phan finished 41st in the all-around competition at the 2016 Olympic Test Event to qualify for the 2016 Olympic Games in Rio de Janeiro. Competing with an injury, she scored 14.300 on vault, 11.600 on uneven bars, 13.800 on balance beam and 13.000 on floor exercise. One month later, she competed on vault and balance beam at the World Challenge Cup in Varna and finished second on both events (14.400 average on vault and 14.367 on balance beam).

At the 2016 Olympic Games, Phan competed on two events in the qualification round: vault and balance beam. For her first vault, she performed a double-twisting Yurchenko and scored 14.700. Her second vault, a handspring pike front with a half twist, was much less difficult and scored 13.766. With an average score of 14.233, Phan was 17th out of 19 competitors who performed two vaults. On the balance beam, she scored 13.800 and finished 36th out of 82 competitors.

Retirement 
Following the 2016 Olympic Games, Phan continued to be plagued with a number of injuries which had forced her to reduce difficulty on power events, vault and floor exercise in particular, over the previous two years. She decided to officially retire at the end of 2016 and focus on coaching and developing the women's gymnastics program in Vietnam with her former coach and national team coach, Nguyen Thi Thanh Thuy.

References

External links
 

1991 births
Living people
People from Haiphong
Vietnamese female artistic gymnasts
Olympic gymnasts of Vietnam
Gymnasts at the 2012 Summer Olympics
Gymnasts at the 2016 Summer Olympics
Gymnasts at the 2010 Asian Games
Gymnasts at the 2014 Asian Games
Asian Games medalists in gymnastics
Medalists at the World Artistic Gymnastics Championships
Asian Games silver medalists for Vietnam
Asian Games bronze medalists for Vietnam
Medalists at the 2014 Asian Games
Southeast Asian Games gold medalists for Vietnam
Southeast Asian Games silver medalists for Vietnam
Southeast Asian Games bronze medalists for Vietnam
Southeast Asian Games medalists in gymnastics
Competitors at the 2003 Southeast Asian Games
Competitors at the 2005 Southeast Asian Games
Competitors at the 2007 Southeast Asian Games
Competitors at the 2011 Southeast Asian Games
Competitors at the 2015 Southeast Asian Games
21st-century Vietnamese women
20th-century Vietnamese women